The5 were an Arab pop boy band composed of Kazem Chamas, Ahmed Hassan, Adil Echbiy, Said Karmouz and Mohamed Bouhezza (aka BMd). They finished third in the fourth series of the Arabic televised singing competition The X Factor Arabia in 2015

The X Factor Arabia 
In 2015, Kazem Chamas, Ahmed Hassan and Adil Echbiy auditioned as solo candidates for the fourth series of the Arabic televised singing competition The X Factor Arabia, whereas Said Karmouz and Mohamed Bouhezza (aka BMd) auditioned together. They were put together to form a five-piece boy band in Beirut, Lebanon, thus qualifying for the "Groups" category. Elissa and Donia Samir Ghanem, their future mentor, have both come up with the idea of forming the band. On June 13, 2015, they competed in the finals and placed third (Groups category), losing to Hind Ziadi (Arab Solo category) and Hamza Hawsawi (International Solo category).

Music career

After break-up
The band broke up in 2019. 

The Egyptian Ahmed Hasan even while with the band played the odd solo acoustic gig in a few Cairo venues. His official debut solo single was "Garah Eh" (meaning What Happened?) followed by "Hayaty Ahla" (meaning My Life is Better). 

The Algerian Mohamed Bouhezza (also known as BMd) and the group's resident rapper has chosen a path of hip hop releasing the track "Mouraya", an Arabic cover of "Moonlight" by American rapper XXXTentacion. BmD's release came on the back of last year's debut solo pop and R&B single "Manich Mertah" (I Am Not Comfortable). Bouhezza also performs occasional acoustic sets in Algiers.

The Moroccan Adil Echbiy went solo releasing his debut single "Sem3i".

But has not launched his own solo career.

The Algerian Said Karmouz had a hiatus from music putting even his Instagram account to private although he resumed some tweeting after a five-month break. He has released no music and did not comment on the band's split and his future plans.

Discography / videos
"El Donia Shabab" (5 October 2015)
"Bil Gharam" (30 December 2015)
"Hiyya Kidah el Hayat" (25 May 2016)
"Ala Tabeetak Koon" (15 September 2016)
"Nekbar Sawa" (23 August 2017)آ
"La Bezzaf" (27 October 2017)
"Hannini" (21 November 2017)

References

Lebanese pop music groups
Boy bands
Musical groups established in 2015
Musical quintets
2015 establishments in Lebanon
Singers who perform in Egyptian Arabic